Sherry Rehman (born 21 December 1960) is a Pakistani politician, journalist and former diplomat who has been the member of the Senate of Pakistan since 2015. She was the first female Leader of the Opposition in the Senate from March to August 2018 and served as Pakistan's Ambassador to the United States from 2011 to 2013. She is currently serving as the Federal Minister for the Ministry of Climate Change.

Born in Karachi, Rehman received her B.A from Smith College and her M.A in art history from the University of Sussex. In 1988, she joined the Herald as its editor and remained with the magazine until 1999. In 2002, she was elected to the National Assembly of Pakistan. She was re-elected in 2008, and became a member of the Federal Cabinet under Prime Minister Gillani as the Minister for Information.

She resigned from the cabinet in 2009 and went on to serve as the Chair of the Pakistan Red Crescent and founded the non-partisan think tank, Jinnah Institute. In November 2011, she was appointed as the Ambassador to the United States and remained until April 2013. In 2015, she was elected to the Senate.

Early life and education
Sherbano Rehman was born on 21 December 1960 in Karachi to Hassanally A. Rahman. Her mother served as first vice president of the State Bank of Pakistan. Rehman attended the Karachi Grammar School receiving her A level from there, she moved to the United States where she studied at the Smith College in Northampton, Massachusetts, where she received her B.A. in political science in 1985. She moved to the United Kingdom, where she received an M.A. in art history from the University of Sussex. She serves as the chairperson of the Jinnah Institute, a research organisation.

Professional career
Rehman started her professional career as a journalist with The Daily Star and then joined The Herald and became its editor-in-chief at the age of 26, serving until 1998. After leaving the Herald in 1998, she co-authored the book The Kashmiri Shawl: From Jamawar to Paisley. She worked as a professional journalist for 20 years and served as a member of the Council of Pakistan Newspaper Editors from 1988 to 1998. Rehman hosted a television current affairs show in 1999. She has also worked for the Pakistan Red Crescent Society as chairperson.

Political career

She was elected to the National Assembly of Pakistan for the first time as a candidate for PPP on reserved seat for women in 2002 Pakistani general election where she remained until 2007. During her tenure as Member of the National Assembly, she remained Central Information Secretary of PPP, President of Policy Planning for the PPP and remained a part of the party's Foreign Relations Committee.

Rehman was re-elected to the National Assembly as a candidate for PPP on the reserved seat for women from Sindh in 2008 Pakistani general election. During her second tenure as Member of the National Assembly, she authored severals legislations which were tabled in the National Assembly.

In March 2008, she was inducted into the federal cabinet of Prime Minister Yousaf Raza Gillani and was appointed as the Minister for Information and Broadcasting. She was given the additional ministerial portfolio of Health in April 2008, Women Development and Culture in May 2008. She remained Minister for Culture until August 2008. In November 2008, she relinquished portfolios of Health and Women Development.

Rehman resigned her post as Information Minister in March 2009 in protest over government attempt to put restrictions on the press freedom.

In 2010, she tabled a bill seeking to abolish the death penalty for blasphemy, as a result she was placed under police surveillance after receiving death threats. Rehman was accused of committing "blasphemy, a crime that carries the death penalty" in Pakistan" in connection with a 2010 TV talk show." Her accusers went to the Pakistan "Supreme Court with his complaint after police refused to register it. The court ordered police in the central Pakistani city of Multan to investigate."

In November 2011, Rehman was named Pakistan's Ambassador to United States following the resignation of Hussain Haqqani, who was asked to resign by Prime Minister Gilani in the wake of the "Memogate" scandal. While ambassador, she called on the United States to stop its drone strikes in Pakistan. She quit the office of Pakistan's ambassador in the US in May 2013.

In June 2015, she was elected to the Senate of Pakistan for the first time as a candidate of PPP on general seat from Sindh and replaced Abdul Latif Ansari.

In March 2018, she was elected as the Leader of the Opposition in the Senate and became the first female in Pakistan to hold the office. She served as the Leader of the Opposition in the Senate till August 2018.

In 2020, she created controversy when she clapped back at PTI Senator Mohsin Aziz for his comments, "Mera Jism Meri Marzi, MeToo and apna khana khud garam kero." She argued that parliament should not play the culture and religious card when talking about women’s rights.

As of 2020, she was the chairperson on the Senate committee on the China-Pakistan Economic Corridor (CPEC).

In 2022 she spoke to international media about major floods.

Awards and recognition
In 2002, she became first Pakistani to be recognised with an award for independent journalism by the UK House of Lords in its Muslim World Awards Ceremony.
In January 2009, a report of the International Republican Institute referred to her as "Democracy's Hero" as a result of her struggle for the cause of democracy in Pakistan. In the same month, Rehman was named among the "100 Most Influential Asians" by UAE magazine Ahlan.
In 2012, she received Smith College Medal for her 'extraordinary achievements and outstanding service' to Pakistan.
In 2006, she received R.L Shep Ethnic Textiles Book Award, for The Kashmiri Shawl.
In 2008, she was presented the International Peace Award for Democrats by the Human Rights Commission.
She also won the International Human Rights Commission Award for her work for human rights and peace.
In 2009, she was given the title of "Democracy's Hero" by the International Republican Institute.
In 2009, she received 'The Freedom Award' Pakistan by the Association of Television Journalists.
In 2011, she received Jeane J. Kirkpatrick Award by The Women's Democracy Network, Washington
In 2013, she received the Nishan-e-Imtiaz, Pakistan's highest civilian honor by the President of Pakistan Asif Ali Zardari.

References

External links 

 'Womansplaining in the context of Pakistani politics, activism', a discussion between author Sherry Rehman and moderator lawyer Sahar Bandial at a Lahore Literary Festival 2022, Ahsan Raza, Dawn   March 21, 2022  

1960 births
Pakistan People's Party politicians
Pakistani women journalists
Smith College alumni
Living people
Alumni of the University of Sussex
Ambassadors of Pakistan to the United States
Sindhi people
Politicians from Karachi
Pakistani women ambassadors
Pakistani senators (14th Parliament)
Women members of the National Assembly of Pakistan
Pakistani MNAs 2002–2007
Pakistani MNAs 2008–2013
21st-century Pakistani women politicians